2 Alive (stylized as 2 Alivë) is the second studio album by American rapper Yeat. It was released on February 18, 2022, by Geffen Records, Interscope Records, Field Trip Recordings, Listen To The Kids and Twizzy Rich. The album features guest appearances from Young Thug, Gunna, Yung Kayo, Ken Carson, and SeptembersRich. The album was supported by one single, "Still Countin", which was released on February 11, 2022. The deluxe edition, titled 2 Alive (Geek Pack), was released on April 1, 2022, with additional guest appearances by Lil Uzi Vert and Lancey Foux.

Release and promotion
2 Alive serves as the sequel to Yeat's April 2021 album Alive. It was announced shortly after the release of his September 2021 album Up 2 Me. Yeat initially announced a January 2022 release date but delayed it to wait for an additional feature. On February 13, the release date was announced. Yeat then posted the official track listing on February 16, shortly after the album leaked that same day. On March 16, Yeat announced a supporting tour for the album, which included dates from April 8 to May 9.

Commercial performance
2 Alive sold 35,000 album-equivalent units in the first week, debuting at number 6 on the US Billboard 200 chart. It is Yeat's first US top-ten album.

Singles
The album's lone single, "Still Countin", was released on February 11, 2022, accompanied by a music video posted to the Lyrical Lemonade channel directed by Cole Bennett, marking the first collaboration between the two. This was Bennett's first video to feature two songs, including visuals for both "Still Countin" and the album's intro track "Poppin".

Critical reception

In a positive review, David Aaron Brake of HipHopDX wrote that "though he didn't expand beyond the sounds of his previous work, Yeat's latest is a master class in precision and knowing what the audience craves. Excellent rap need not always be grand in scope: 2 Alivë proves success can come just as easily through zooming in".

In a mixed review, Alphonse Pierre of Pitchfork wrote that "the 21-year-old Portland rapper isn't doing anything all that new, but he has a refreshing album-focused approach, best listened to as one continuous stream, getting lost in the noisy madness". Writing for AllMusic, David Crone felt that the album's 20-song track list is "undeniably bloated, padded out with some fairly one-dimensional material".

Track listing

Notes
 Any song title that contains the letter 'e' is replaced with 'ë'. For example, "Rackz Got Me" is stylized as "Rackz Got Më". If a song contains two or more 'e's, then the first one is only replaced.
  signifies an uncredited co-producer

Personnel
 Joe LaPorta – mastering
 Noah Smith – mixing, recording

Charts

Weekly charts

Year-end charts

References

2022 albums
Geffen Records albums
Yeat albums
Interscope Records albums